Richard "Rich" Lee is an American music video and commercial director. He has directed music videos for Eminem, Lana Del Rey, Maroon 5, The Black Eyed Peas, Norah Jones, Michael Bublé and The All-American Rejects. Rich Lee started his professional career as a sculptor and fabricator for Broadway shows in New York City. He later moved on to computer graphics and created 3-D previsualizations for big budget Hollywood feature films such as the first three Pirates of the Caribbean films, I Am Legend, Minority Report and Constantine. From the encouragement of feature film directors he moved into directing music videos and commercials. He has directed commercials for brands like Fiat, Hyundai, Honda, Beats by Dre etc.

Videography

Television

Notes
  – Directed with Marc Webb.
  – Skylar Grey does not appear in the music video.
  – "Imma Be" and "Rock That Body" combined into one video.
  - Video currently in production.

References

External links
 

American film directors
Living people
American music video directors
1978 births